Fenway Health (formally Fenway Community Health Center, Inc.) is an LGBT (lesbian, gay, bisexual and transgender) health care, research and advocacy organization founded by Northeastern University students and headquartered in Boston, Massachusetts.

History
In 1971, Northeastern University students opened a drop-in center in the basement of a building owned by the Christian Science Church. They named the center the Fenway Community Health Center and staffed it with volunteer nursing students. By 1973, demand had grown to the point where Fenway incorporated as a freestanding health center and sought a larger space at 16 Haviland Street. Today, this space serves as Fenway: Sixteen, the home of Fenway's HIV Counseling, Testing & Referrals Program, Health Navigation Services, Helplines, and gay and bisexual men's health programs. The 16 Haviland Street location has since been closed as Fenway continues its attempts at reaching a broader audience than its traditional LGBT+ clients. In 1978, the center became fully licensed by the Massachusetts Department of Public Health.

Fenway became involved in treating HIV/AIDS patients in the early 1980s. In 1981, Fenway made the first diagnosis of AIDS in New England. Fenway's involvement with advocacy and HIV/AIDS research led to its 1994 selection by the National Institute of Allergies and Infectious Diseases as one of eight sites recruiting participants for the first clinical trials of an HIV vaccine.

Fenway's Alternative Insemination program, one of the first in the nation to offer AI services to lesbians, saw its first baby born in 1985.

Fenway held its first annual Dinner Party in 1992, a fundraiser for Fenway Women's Health that will become one of the largest LGBTQIA+ events in the nation.

In 1999, Fenway held the first annual Audre Lorde Cancer Awareness Brunch, a celebration of women of color and their supporters whose lives have been affected by cancer.

In 2001, Fenway launched The Fenway Institute, a national interdisciplinary center dedicated to ensuring cultural competence in health care for the LGBT community through research and evaluation, training and education, and policy and advocacy.

Fenway launched the Transgender Health Program in 2004 to help provide health care to this often underserved population. Seeing over 4,400 patients today, the program continues to expand to comprehensively address the needs of our transgender and gender non-conforming community.

Fenway's current Ansin Building home at 1340 Boylston Street in Boston opened its doors in 2009.

In 2013, Fenway Health added two organizations to the Fenway family: the LGBT Aging Project and the AIDS Action Committee.

In 2015, Fenway's National LGBT Health Education Center held a first-of-its kind medical conference focused on transgender health.

In December 2017, Fenway's CEO, Steven Boswell, resigned due to his handling of complaints about a prominent doctor who allegedly sexually harassed and bullied staff members of the health clinic. Boswell reportedly ignored a recommendation by an independent law firm to fire the doctor with numerous complaints of harassment.  The center's board appointed M. Jane Powers, Fenway's director of behavioral health, as interim CEO.

In 2017, Jennifer Potter, MD, was named co-chair of The Fenway Institute, alongside Kenneth Mayer, MD.

In early 2020, Ellen LaPointe was named the new CEO of Fenway Health. With the COVID-19 pandemic hitting soon after, Fenway removed the majority of medical and behavioral health appointments to telehealth, established testing programs in Boston and Everett, and activated several research studies, including COVID-19 vaccine trials.

Operations
Services at Fenway Health include medical and mental health, dental, eye care and pharmacy. Fenway also offers HIV prevention and health navigation services, and a Violence Recovery Program.

Fenway is also home to the National LGBTQIA+ Health Education Center. The Center provides educational programs, resources, and consultation to health care organizations with the goal of optimizing quality, cost-effective health care for lesbian, gay, bisexual, transgender, queer, intersex, asexual, and all sexual and gender minority (LGBTQIA+) people.

The Education Center is a part of The Fenway Institute, the internationally renowned research, training, and health policy division of Fenway Health.

Fenway Health's records are located in the Northeastern University Libraries, Archives and Special Collections Department, Boston, Massachusetts.

Publications
In 2007, the American College of Physicians published The Fenway Guide to LGBT Health, edited by Dr. Harvey Makadon, Dr. Kenneth Mayer and Hilary Goldhammer of the Fenway Institute at Fenway Health, and Dr. Jennifer Potter of Beth Israel Deaconess Medical Center.  "We realized this was an important area that wasn't being covered," Dr. Steven Weinberger, senior vice president for medical education and publishing of the American College of Physicians, said in an interview at the time. "It has not been taught in medical school...it sort of falls through the cracks in terms of the standard curriculum."

For People, Not For Profit: A History of Fenway Health's First Forty Years was written by former board member Tom Martorelli and published in 2012. The foreword is written by Rita Mae Brown.

In 2017, The Fenway Institute published a policy brief describing the effect that the American Health Care Act of 2017 would have on LGBT people and people living with HIV.

In 2018, The Institute published a brief on best practices for retaining transgender women in HIV care.

The Institute published a brief in 2019 outlining best practices for the management and treatment of incarcerated LGBTI individuals.

Also in 2019, The Institute published a guide to promoting cervical cancer screening among female-to-male transmasculine patients.

In 2020, The Institute published a brief addressing special COVID-19 considerations for people living with HIV and LGBTQIA+ people.

Also in 2020, The Institute published a guide to achieving a healthy, thriving community of LGBTQIA+ older adults in Massachusetts.

Notes

Additional Sources
 Thomas Mortarelli, For People, Not For Profit: A History of Fenway Health's First Forty Years (AuthorHouse, 2012), 

Organizations based in Boston
Organizations established in 1971
LGBT health organizations in the United States
Medical and health organizations based in Massachusetts
1971 establishments in Massachusetts